Hamilton Owen Rendel (1843–17 September 1902) designed and installed the original raising mechanism of the Tower Bridge while working for Sir W. G. Armstrong Mitchell & Company of Newcastle upon Tyne.

Family
Rendel was a member of a notable family of engineers. His father, James Meadows Rendel, was a civil engineer who married his mother, Catherine Jane Harris. His siblings were:
 Sir Alexander Meadows Rendel (1829–1918) – civil engineer
 George Wightwick Rendel (1833–1902) – naval architect and civil engineer
 Emily Frances Rendel (1836–1897) married Charles Bowen, 1st Baron Bowen in 1862.
 Emily Catherine Rendel (1840–1921) married Clement Francis Wedgwood in 1866
 Stuart Rendel, 1st Baron Rendel

A cousin, James Murray Dobson, became resident engineer of the Buenos Aires harbour works in the 1880s and 1890s.

Career
Rendel took his degree at Cambridge University, and immediately after leaving started at the Armstrong, Mitchell and Company at Elswick, Tyne and Wear, where he later became head of the engineerings department. He retired in early 1902 due to ill health, and died later the same year on 17 September 1902 as he was visiting his sister Mrs. Wedgwood at her residence The Lea, in Barlaston, Staffordshire. He was buried at Kensal Green Cemetery in London.

Tower Bridge hydraulics

The mechanism was powered by pressurised water stored in several hydraulic accumulators. The accumulators each comprise a  ram on which sits a very heavy weight to maintain the desired pressure.

References

1843 births
1902 deaths
Engineers from Tyne and Wear
Burials at Kensal Green Cemetery